O. B. Ellis Unit (E1, previously Ellis I Unit) is a Texas Department of Criminal Justice prison located in unincorporated Walker County, Texas,  north of Huntsville. From 1965 to 1999 it was the location of the State of Texas men's death row.

History

The unit opened in July 1965. It was named after Oscar B. Ellis, a former prison director of Texas. George Beto designed the unit, making it to be the strictest prison in the system, and Jim Estelle, the following prison director, continued the course of action Beto established.

From 1965 to 1999 the unit housed the male death row, which had moved from Huntsville Unit. Michael Berryhill, an author, said "You had the toughest convicts, and the general philosophy was you needed the toughest warden. Wallace Pack was assigned to keep the lid on Ellis. The inmates in the prison were restless. There were work stoppages and strikes, and with Judge Justice's opinion, there was an air of expectancy that the brutality and terrible conditions would end." The book In This Timeless Time includes content about the unit's death row.

In April 1981, Eroy Brown, a prisoner who had been convicted of armed robbery and burglary, drowned Wallace Pack, the warden, and shot Billy Moore, the unit's farm manager, during a struggle for Pack's gun. Brown said that they were planning to kill him since he was going to expose a prison theft scheme. Thirty-five of 36 jurors voted in Brown's favor.

After a prisoner named Rodney Hulin fatally injured himself at the Clemens Unit, he was transferred to the Hospital Galveston Unit and then the Ellis Unit. Hulin died in the Ellis Unit in 1997.

In November 1998, six condemned men were absent from their cells for several hours and then coordinated an escape attempt. One of the men, Martin Gurule (TDCJ# 999063), successfully escaped and was later found dead in a location near the prison grounds. TDCJ officials said that he drowned on the day of his escape. According to the TDCJ, the prison escape attempt had hastened the agency's decision to move death row inmates to a new location. TDCJ officials also stated that overcrowding at Ellis was another factor in the death row move.

Six months after the escape attempt, the TDCJ decided to move the death row. The Texas Board of Criminal Justice approved the relocation of the men's death row on Friday May 21, 1999. In 1999 the male death row was relocated to the Polunsky Unit (originally known as the Terrell Unit) in West Livingston, Texas. The first 55 inmates, all classified as being disruptive, were moved on Friday June 18, 1999. The death row transfer, which took ten months, was the largest transfer of condemned prisoners in history and was performed under heavy security.

In 2011 the Ellis Unit furniture and wood plant was moved to the Lewis Unit.

Facilities
It has a capacity of about 2,000 prisoners.

 the prison sometimes had temperatures over 90 degrees Fahrenheit since there were no tempered air systems nor air conditioner units.

Death row

When the unit housed the male death row, condemned inmates worked in a garment factory, played basketball, assisted each other with legal work, and worshiped together. The prison guards allowed other offenders to gather and say goodbye to a death row inmate on the night before his execution. According to death row offender Jonathan Bruce Reed (Texas Department of Criminal Justice Death Row #642, now TDCJ#1743674 due to a reduction of the sentence to life imprisonment on November 3, 2011), the attitude of the death row was "We can afford you some sort of reasonable life—within security confines" and that death row inmates "lived as humans". Reed said that condemned inmates sometimes violated the rules by smoking, getting tattoos, making wine, and engaging in sexual intercourse with other inmates and officers. Privileges decreased as years passed.

The cells at Ellis's death row had bars on them. Sometimes there were two death row inmates per cell. Inmates were permitted to watch televisions located in the facility.

Steve Earle recorded "Ellis Unit One" for the 1995 film Dead Man Walking. The song's lyrics focus on the effect of the death penalty on the guards that carry it out. Earle has been a vocal critic against the death penalty.

Notable prisoners

Death row prisoners
Former Texas-sentenced inmates (all death row inmates on this list had been transferred to Polunsky Unit in 1999, commuted, released, and/or executed)

 Charles Brooks Jr. (executed December 7, 1982)
 Peter Cantu (perpetrator of the murder of Jennifer Ertman and Elizabeth Peña) transferred to Polunsky Unit, executed August 17, 2010
Ignacio Cuevas (perpetrator of the 1974 Huntsville Prison Siege) - executed May 23, 1991
 Carlos DeLuna - executed December 7, 1989
 Jeffrey Dillingham - perpetrator of the murder of Caren Koslow, transferred to Polunsky, executed November 1, 2000
 Kenneth Foster - transferred to Polunsky, sentence commuted to life in prison
 Gustavo Julian Garcia - transferred to Polunsky Unit, executed February 16, 2016
 Humberto Leal Garcia - transferred to Polunsky Unit, executed July 7, 2011.
 Johnny Frank Garrett - executed February 11, 1992
 Gary Graham a.k.a. Shaka Sankofa - moved to Polunsky, executed June 22, 2000
 Anthony Charles Graves - moved to Polunsky, later exonerated
 Jesús Ledesma Aguilar - executed May 24, 2006.
 Kenneth McDuff (TDCJ#999055, executed November 17, 1998)
 José Medellín (perpetrator of the murder of Jennifer Ertman and Elizabeth Peña) - transferred to Polunsky Unit, executed August 5, 2008
 Derrick Sean O'Brien (perpetrator of the murder of Jennifer Ertman and Elizabeth Peña) - transferred to Polunsky Unit, executed July 11, 2006
Ronald Clark O'Bryan - executed March 30, 1984 
Genaro Ruiz Camacho - executed August 26, 1998
Hank Skinner - transferred to Polunsky Unit
Edgar Tamayo - transferred to Polunsky, executed January 22, 2014
 Shannon Charles Thomas - transferred to Polunsky Unit, executed November 16, 2005
Pablo Lucio Vasquez - transferred to Polunsky, executed April 6, 2016
Coy Wesbrook - moved to Polunsky, executed March 9, 2016
Marvin Lee Wilson - moved to Polunsky executed August 7, 2012
Cameron Todd Willingham - transferred to Polunsky Unit, executed February 17, 2004.

Former federal-sentenced inmates:
 Juan Garza - on July 13, 1999, federal authorities moved Garza, who had committed the crime in Texas but was under a federal death sentence, out of the custody of the TDCJ and into Federal Bureau of Prisons (BOP) custody. Garza was one of three condemned inmates moved from the Texas state male death row on that day due to the opening of the new federal death row wing in USP Terre Haute, Terre Haute, Indiana. (executed in Terre Haute June 19, 2001)
 Louis Jones Jr. (transferred to BOP custody) executed in 2003

Non-death row prisoners
Former inmates:
 David Graham, perpetrator of the murder of Adrianne Jones
Christopher Duntsch, Dallas neurosurgeon who is the subject of the Dr. Death podcast.

See also

Sherri Jarvis, a long-unidentified murder victim believed to have been searching for the Ellis Unit according to two unrelated witnesses who had met her the day before she was killed.

References

External links
 Ellis Unit - Texas Department of Criminal Justice
 List of prisoners in the Ellis Unit - The Texas Tribune.
 Stein, Joel (December 14, 1998). "Rooting for the Death-Row Fugitive Guy". Time.
 Dart, Tom (December 2, 2014). "Sane enough for Texas: the Lone Star State's history of executing mentally ill inmates". The Guardian. This article shows an image of the former men's death row at Ellis.

Prisons in Walker County, Texas
Capital punishment in Texas
1965 establishments in Texas